RSX may refer to:

Computing
RSX, a RISC CPU from Encore Computer
RSX-11, an operating system family developed by Digital Equipment Corporation
RSX 'Reality Synthesizer', a graphics chip for the PS3
Resident System Extension, part of the CP/M Plus operating system

Other uses
Acura RSX, an automobile
Rhein-Sieg-Express, a German regional train service
RS:X (sailboard)
RSX Energy, a Canadian oil and gas company
Label for an X-ray observation made by ROSAT